Lapland is an unincorporated community in Scott Township, Montgomery County, in the U.S. state of Indiana.

History
Lapland was platted by William Davis in 1887. The community was probably named after Lapland, in Scandinavia. A post office was established at Lapland in 1885, and remained in operation until it was discontinued in 1899.

Geography

References

Unincorporated communities in Montgomery County, Indiana
Unincorporated communities in Indiana